Nine Girls and a Ghost is a 2002 comedy film, filmed in Cantonese, in which a girl receives a Daihatsu Mira Gino that is possessed by Marco, a ghost.

Plot
Kaka and her group of friends, consisting of nine girls are high school students that rely on other people to do stuff for them such as doing their homework, and cheating on a test. Kaka received a car from her parents, which was later discovered to be haunted by a twenty-three year old ghost name Marco, he was killed in a car accident. Originally, she asked him to help her and her friends to cheat through school, which Marco reluctantly does but he later teaches them that they should rely on themselves rather than others. Kaka and Marco soon fall in love but unfortunately, he could only exist for so long before his soul disappears.

External links
 

2002 films
Chinese comedy films
2002 comedy films
2000s Chinese films